Championship of Yugoslavia in Basketball for  women took place from in 1945. until 1992, the last in the dominance of one club - Belgrade Crvena zvezda.

Although all countries founded after the breakup of Yugoslavia each now have their own national domestic leagues, each of the six nations now take part in the Adriatic League, which was founded in 2001, and which is today the closest league in existence similar to the former Yugoslav Basketball League.

History
After the formation of Socialist Federal Republic of Yugoslavia in 1945, there arose a need for athletic development in the fledgling nation. Post-WW2 Yugoslavia was (with the exception of major cities such as Belgrade, Ljubljana, Zagreb and Sarajevo) for the most part lacking in competitive opportunities in sports. In response to this, 1945 and 1946 saw an explosion of new clubs and leagues for every sport, the basketball league being part of this phenomenon.

The very first competition under the newly formed Yugoslav Basketball League in 1945, drawing parallel to the Yugoslav First League (of football), was more or less a nationwide affirmation of unity. Instead of individual clubs competing in the usual fashion, there were only eight teams. Six representing each state within Yugoslavia, one representing the province of Vojvodina, and the last representing the Yugoslav People's Army.

Champions

Championship winning teams

Yugoslav basketball clubs in European-wide competitions (1958-1992)

European Champions Cup

Ronchetti Cup

Notes

References

External links
 Yugoslav Women Basketball League

 
Yugoslavia
1945 establishments in Yugoslavia
Sports leagues established in 1945
Basketball leagues in Yugoslavia
Women's basketball competitions in Yugoslavia
Sports leagues disestablished in 1992
1992 disestablishments in Yugoslavia
Basketball women